Edwin Romanzo Elmer (1850–1923) was an American portrait, genre and still life painter. Known for his attention to detail, he was also an inventor of a machine for braiding horsewhips.

Spending most of his life in Ashfield, Massachusetts,  Elmer is best known for his painting Mourning Picture. This 1890 family portrait depicts the artist, his wife, and their daughter Effie who had died shortly before it was painted. The painting is noted for its intricate detail and the contrast between the mourning family, who sit in relative darkness, and the dead daughter, who is bathed in sunlight. It was first displayed in a local post office in 1890, then disappeared until the 1950s, when a niece of the artist showed it to the director of the Smith Museum. It was then that Elmer's talent was first recognized and his paintings put on display.

The poet Adrienne Rich has written a poem about Mourning Picture from the dead daughter's point of view.  The picture now hangs in the Smith College Museum of Art – Northampton, Massachusetts.

References

19th-century American painters
American male painters
20th-century American painters
American portrait painters
1850 births
1923 deaths
People from Ashfield, Massachusetts
Painters from Massachusetts
19th-century American male artists
20th-century American male artists